Fredericksburg Hotspur is an American soccer team based in Fredericksburg, Virginia, United States. Founded in 2010, the team played in the USL Premier Development League (PDL), the fourth tier of the American Soccer Pyramid, in the South Atlantic Division of the Eastern Conference.

The team played its home games at the UMW Battleground Stadium on the campus of the University of Mary Washington. The team's colors were red, black and white.

The team was part of the larger Fredericksburg Area Soccer Association, which was a fixture in the Central Virginia soccer scene for more than 30 years, and which began its involvement with USL in 2010 with 10 teams participating in the USL Super Y-League and USL Super-20 League.

History
Fredericksburg Hotspur was announced as a USL Premier Development League expansion franchise on September 16, 2010. The team played its first game on May 7, 2011, a 2-0 loss to the Virginia Beach Piranhas.

In 2014, the team merged with and was rebranded as Fredericksburg FC.

Players

Current roster
2012 Roster

Year-by-year

Head coach
  Jason Kilby (2012–present)

Assistant coaches
 Travis Mulraine ( 2012–present)
 Keith Marine (2012–present)

Stadium
 UMW Battleground Stadium at the University of Mary Washington; Fredericksburg, Virginia (2011–present)

Average attendance
Attendance stats are calculated by averaging each team's self-reported home attendances from the historical match archive at https://web.archive.org/web/20100105175057/http://www.uslsoccer.com/history/index_E.html.

 2011: to be announced

References

External links
Official Site
Official PDL site

Association football clubs established in 2010
USL League Two teams
Soccer clubs in Virginia
2010 establishments in Virginia